Benjamin Taylor Homestead, also known as Dolington Manor, is a historic home located at Lower Makefield Township, Bucks County, Pennsylvania. It is a -story, seven bay stone dwelling built in three sections between 1738 and 1820.  It has a gable roof and measures 30 feet by 60 feet.  The front facade features an arcade and two entryways.

It was added to the National Register of Historic Places in 1973.

References

Houses on the National Register of Historic Places in Pennsylvania
Houses completed in 1820
Houses in Bucks County, Pennsylvania
National Register of Historic Places in Bucks County, Pennsylvania